Maicol Rastelli (born 28 April 1991) is an Italian cross-country skier. He competed in the World Cup 2015 season.

He represented Italy at the FIS Nordic World Ski Championships 2015 in Falun.

Cross-country skiing results
All results are sourced from the International Ski Federation (FIS).

Olympic Games

Distance reduced to 30 km due to weather conditions.

World Championships

World Cup

Season standings

Individual podiums
1 podium – (1 )

References

External links 
 

1991 births
Living people
Italian male cross-country skiers
Cross-country skiers at the 2018 Winter Olympics
Cross-country skiers at the 2022 Winter Olympics
Olympic cross-country skiers of Italy
Tour de Ski skiers
People from Sondalo
Sportspeople from the Province of Sondrio